The Pembelik Dam is a gravity dam on the Peri River (a tributary of the Euphrates), in Karakoçan district of Elazığ Province, Turkey. Its primary purpose is hydroelectric power generation and is the fourth dam in the Peri River cascade. Construction on the dam began in 2009 and its two generators were commissioned in February/March 2015. It is owned and operated by Limak Energy and Bilgin Energy.

See also

Özlüce Dam – upstream
Seyrantepe Dam – downstream

References

Dams in Elazığ Province
Gravity dams
Roller-compacted concrete dams
Dams completed in 2015
Dams on the Peri River
2015 establishments in Turkey
Energy infrastructure completed in 2015
Hydroelectric power stations in Turkey
21st-century architecture in Turkey